Ilana Berger (born 1965) is a Mexican-born Israeli professional tennis player and Olympian.

Berger reached her highest individual ranking on the WTA Tour on 10 August 1992, when she became # 149 in the world. On 25 November 1991, she peaked at world number 153 in the doubles rankings.

Biography
Berger was born on 31 December 1965, in Mexico City, Mexico. She started playing tennis at the age of 7.

Tennis career
In the late 1980s, after serving for two years in the Israel Defense Forces, Berger became a professional tennis player. She won 7 singles titles in the ITF Women's Circuit.

Berger won 12 Maccabiah Games medals during her career, including gold, a few of them as a "veteran" while playing Mixed Doubles with Shlomo Glickstein. At the 1989 Maccabiah Games she beat American Andrea Berger to win a gold medal in women's singles.

Berger was elected as one of three best tennis players in Israel's history in the celebrations of Israel's first 50 years.

Berger was Israel's Women's National Champion for five years.

Berger competed for Israel at the 1988 Summer Olympics in Seoul.

Berger represented Israel in 26 meetings in the Federation Cup from 1986–92, going 19–21.

Journalism career
At the age of 26, she decided to study literature and journalism. She worked 7 years as a sports correspondent for Haaretz. She coaches tennis privately and is a freelance sports journalist. Today she is chief editor of the internet site of the Tel Aviv University Sports Center.

ITF Finals

Singles Finals: 13 (8-5)

Doubles Finals: 25 (15-10)

See also
List of select Jewish tennis players

References

External links

 
 
 
 

1965 births
Living people
Tennis players from Mexico City
Mexican Jews
Mexican emigrants to Israel
Mexican people of Israeli descent
Israeli female tennis players
Israeli people of Mexican-Jewish descent
Tennis players at the 1988 Summer Olympics
Jewish Israeli sportspeople
Jewish tennis players
Olympic tennis players of Israel
Maccabiah Games gold medalists for Israel
Maccabiah Games medalists in tennis
Competitors at the 1989 Maccabiah Games